Leonardo Nicolás Díaz (Born 6 September 1972 Santa Fe) is a former Argentine association football goalkeeper, and currently is an assistant coach at Cucuta Deportivo club in Colombia.

Career
Díaz began his playing career in 1995 with Colón de Santa Fe. His debut came in a 1–0 away defeat to Gimnasia y Esgrima de Jujuy on 20 August 1995. He went on to make over 200 league appearances for the Santa Fe Club.

Diaz has also played for a number of other teams such as Independiente, Deportivo Cali, CSD Municipal, Huracán and Deportes Concepción.

In 2009, he joined newly promoted Boca Unidos in the Argentine 2nd division. In July 2010 he transferred to Bolivian club The Strongest

External links
 Primera División statistics
 BDFA profile
 

1972 births
Living people
Footballers from Santa Fe, Argentina
Argentine footballers
Argentina under-20 international footballers
Argentina youth international footballers
Club Atlético Colón footballers
Club Atlético Independiente footballers
Club Atlético Huracán footballers
Deportivo Cali footballers
C.S.D. Municipal players
Deportes Concepción (Chile) footballers
The Strongest players
Boca Unidos footballers
Argentine Primera División players
Categoría Primera A players
Argentine expatriate footballers
Expatriate footballers in Guatemala
Expatriate footballers in Chile
Expatriate footballers in Bolivia
Expatriate footballers in Colombia
Association football goalkeepers